Westbourne Gardens, known as Westbourne Park until the late nineteenth century, are gardens on a triangular plot in Paddington, London, in the City of Westminster. The gardens are open to the public and maintained by the City of Westminster.

Location

The gardens are surrounded by terraces of Georgian townhouses also known as Westbourne Gardens which continue north to Westbourne Park Road, east to Porchester Road, south to Sunderland Terrace, and west to Durham Terrace.

History

Westbourne Gardens is one of eleven streets in the Westbourne area of Paddington named after the River Westbourne that once flowed through the area above ground but was culverted and enclosed in the nineteenth century.

Former residents
 Alexander Tudor-Hart, British communist, lived at 5c in the 1930s.
 Reginald Smith-Rose, physicist, was born at No. 7 in 1894.

References

External links 

Streets in the City of Westminster
Paddington
Gardens in London
Westbourne, London